Class R:Medicine is a classification used by the Library of Congress Classification system. This page outlines the subclasses of Class R.

R - Medicine (General) 

5-130.5......................................General works
131-687.....................................History of medicine. Medical expeditions
690-697.....................................Medicine as a profession. Physicians
702-703.....................................Medicine and the humanities. Medicine and disease in relation to history, literature, etc.
711-713.97................................Directories
722-722.32................................Missionary medicine. Medical missionaries
723-726.....................................Medical philosophy. Medical ethics
726.5-726.8...............................Medicine and disease in relation to psychology. Terminal care. Dying
727-727.5..................................Medical personnel and the public. Physician and the public
728-733.....................................Practice of medicine. Medical practice economics
735-854.....................................Medical education. Medical schools. Research
855-855.5..................................Medical technology
856-857.....................................Biomedical engineering. Electronics. Instrumentation
858-859.7..................................Computer applications to medicine. Medical informatics
864............................................Medical records
895-920.....................................Medical physics. Medical radiology. Nuclear medicine

RA - Public aspects of medicine 

1-418.5....................................Medicine and the state
396................................................Regulation of medical education. Licensure
398................................................Registration of physicians, pharmacists, etc.
399................................................Regulation of medical practice. Evaluation and quality control of medical care. Medical audit
405................................................Death certification
407-409.5......................................Health status indicators. Medical statistics and surveys
410-410.9......................................Medical economics. Economics of medical care. Employment
411-415.........................................Provisions for personal medical care. Medical care plans
418-418.5......................................Medicine and society. Social medicine. Medical sociology
421-790.95..............................Public health. Hygiene. Preventive medicine
428-428.5......................................Public health laboratories, institutes, etc.
440-440.87....................................Study and teaching. Research
565-600.........................................Environmental health Including sewage disposal, air pollution, nuisances, water supply
601-602.........................................Food and food supply in relation to public health
604-618.........................................Parks, public baths, public carriers, buildings, etc.
619-637.........................................Disposal of the dead. Undertaking. Burial. Cremation. Cemeteries
638................................................Immunity and immunization in relation to public health
639-642.........................................Transmission of disease
643-645.........................................Disease (Communicable and noninfectious) and public health
645.3-645.37.................................Home health care services
645.5-645.9...................................Emergency medical services
646-648.3......................................War and public health
648.5-767......................................Epidemics. Epidemiology. Quarantine. Disinfection
771-771.7......................................Rural health and hygiene. Rural health services
773-788.........................................Personal health and hygiene Including clothing, bathing, exercise, travel, nutrition, sleep, sex hygiene
790-790.95....................................Mental health. Mental illness prevention
791-954...................................Medical geography. Climatology. Meteorology
960-1000.5..............................Medical centers. Hospitals. Dispensaries. Clinics. Including ambulance service, nursing homes, hospices
1001-1171...............................Forensic medicine. Medical jurisprudence. Legal medicine
1190-1270...............................Toxicology. Poisons

RB - Pathology 

1-17........................................General works
24-33.......................................Pathological anatomy and histology
37-56.5....................................Clinical pathology. Laboratory technique
57...........................................Post-mortem examination. Autopsies
127-150...................................Manifestations of disease
151-214...................................Theories of disease. Etiology. Pathogenesis

RC - Internal medicine 

49-52.......................................Psychosomatic medicine
71-78.7....................................Examination. Diagnosis Including radiography
81-82.......................................Popular medicine
86-88.9....................................Medical emergencies. Critical care. Intensive care. First aid
91-103.....................................Disease due to physical and chemical agents
109-216...................................Infectious and parasitic diseases
251..........................................Constitutional diseases (General)
254-282...................................Neoplasms. Tumors. Oncology Including cancer and carcinogens
306-320.5................................Tuberculosis
321-571...................................Neurosciences. Biological psychiatry. Neuropsychiatry
346-429.........................................Neurology. Diseases of the nervous system Including speech disorders
435-571...............................................Psychiatry
475-489.....................................................Therapeutics. Psychotherapy
490-499.....................................................Hypnotism and hypnosis. Suggestion therapy
500-510.....................................................Psychoanalysis
512-569.5..................................................Psychopathology
512-528...........................................................Psychoses
530-552...........................................................Neuroses
554-569.5........................................................Personality disorders. Behavior problems Including sexual problems, drug abuse, suicide, child abuse
569.7-571..................................................Mental retardation. Developmental disabilities
581-951...................................Specialties of internal medicine
581-607.........................................Immunologic diseases. Allergy
620-627.........................................Nutritional diseases. Deficiency diseases
627.5-632......................................Metabolic diseases
633-647.5......................................Diseases of the blood and blood-forming organs
648-665.........................................Diseases of the endocrine glands. Clinical endocrinology
666-701.........................................Diseases of the circulatory (Cardiovascular) system
705-779.........................................Diseases of the respiratory system
799-869.........................................Diseases of the digestive system. Gastroenterology
870-923.........................................Diseases of the genitourinary system. Urology
924-924.5......................................Diseases of the connective tissues
925-935.........................................Diseases of the musculoskeletal system
952-1245.................................Special situations and conditions
952-954.6......................................Geriatrics
955-962.........................................Arctic medicine. Tropical medicine
963-969.........................................Industrial medicine. Industrial hygiene
970-986.........................................Military medicine. Naval medicine
1000-1020.....................................Submarine medicine
1030-1160.....................................Transportation medicine Including automotive, aviation, and space medicine
1200-1245.....................................Sports medicine

RD - Surgery 

1-31.7.....................................General works
32-33.9....................................Operative surgery. Technique of surgical operations
49-52.......................................Surgical therapeutics. Preoperative and postoperative care
57...........................................Surgical pathology
58...........................................Reparative processes after operations (Physiological)
59...........................................Surgical shock. Traumatic shock
63-76.......................................Operating rooms and theaters. Instruments, apparatus, and appliances
78.3-87.3.................................Anesthesiology
91-91.5....................................Asepsis and antisepsis. Sterilization (Operative)
92-97.8....................................Emergency surgery. Wounds and injuries
98-98.4....................................Surgical complications
99-99.35..................................Surgical nursing
101-104...................................Fractures (General)
118-120.5................................Plastic surgery. Reparative surgery
120.6-129.8.............................Transplantation of organs, tissues, etc.
130..........................................Prosthesis. Artificial organs
137-145...................................Surgery in childhood, adolescence, pregnancy, old age
151-498...................................Military and naval surgery
520-599.5................................Surgery by region, system, or organ
651-678...................................Neoplasms. Tumors. Oncology
680-688...................................Diseases of the locomotor system (Surgical treatment)
701-811...................................Orthopedic surgery
792-811.........................................Physical rehabilitation

RE - Ophthalmology 

75-79.......................................Examination. Diagnosis
80-87.......................................Eye surgery
88............................................Ophthalmic nursing
89............................................Eye banks
91-912.....................................Particular diseases of the eye
918-921...................................Color vision tests, charts, etc.
925-939...................................Refraction and errors of refraction and accommodation
939.2-981................................Optometry. Opticians. Eyeglasses
986-988...................................Artificial eyes and other prostheses
991-992...................................Ocular therapeutics

RF - Otorhinolaryngology 

110-320...................................Otology. Diseases of the ear
341-437...................................Rhinology. Diseases of the nose, accessory sinuses, and nasopharynx
460-547...................................Laryngology. Diseases of the throat

RG - Gynaecology and Obstetrics 

104-104.7................................Operative gynecology
133-137.6................................Conception. Artificial insemination. Contraception
138.........................................Sterilization of women
159-208...................................Functional and systemic disorders. Endocrine gynecology
211-483...................................Abnormalities and diseases of the female genital organs
484-485...................................Urogynecology and obstetric urology. Urogynecologic surgery
491-499...................................Diseases of the breast
500-991...................................Obstetrics
551-591.........................................Pregnancy
600-650.........................................The embryo and fetus
648.....................................................Spontaneous abortion. Miscarriage
651-721.........................................Labor. Parturition
725-791.........................................Obstetric operations. Operative obstetrics
801-871.........................................Puerperal state
940-991.........................................Maternal care. Prenatal care services

RJ - Pediatrics 

47.3-47.4.................................Genetic aspects
50-51.......................................Examination. Diagnosis
52-53.......................................Therapeutics
59-60.......................................Infant and neonatal morbidity and mortality
91............................................Supposed prenatal influence. Prenatal culture. Stirpiculture
101-103...................................Child health. Child health services
125-145...................................Physiology of children and adolescents
206-235...................................Nutrition and feeding of children and adolescents
240..........................................Immunization of children (General)
242-243...................................Hospital care
245-247...................................Nursing of children. Pediatric nursing
250-250.3................................Premature infants
251-325...................................Newborn infants Including physiology, care, treatment, diseases
370-550...................................Diseases of children and adolescents
499-507.........................................Mental disorders. Child psychiatry

RK - Dentistry 

58-59.3....................................Practice of dentistry. Dental economics
60.7-60.8.................................Preventive dentistry
280..........................................Oral and dental anatomy and physiology
301-493...................................Oral and dental medicine. Pathology. Diseases
501-519...................................Operative dentistry. Restorative dentistry
520-528...................................Orthodontics
529-535...................................Oral surgery
641-667...................................Prosthetic dentistry. Prosthodontics

RL - Dermatology 

87-94.......................................Care and hygiene
95............................................Pathological anatomy
110-120...................................Therapeutics
130-169...................................Diseases of the glands, hair, nails
201-331...................................Hyperemias, inflammations, and infections of the skin
391-489...................................Atrophies. Hypertrophies
675..........................................Chronic ulcer of the skin. Bedsores
701-751...................................Diseases due to psychosomatic and nerve disorders. Dermatoneuroses
760-785...................................Diseases due to parasites
790..........................................Pigmentations. Albinism
793..........................................Congenital disorders of the skin. Nevi. Moles

RM - Therapy. Pharmacology 

138.........................................Drug prescribing
139.........................................Prescription writing
146-146.7................................Misuse of therapeutic drugs. Medication errors
147-180...................................Administration of drugs and other therapeutic agents
182-190...................................Other therapeutic procedures. Including acupuncture, pneumatic aspiration, spinal puncture, pericardial puncture
214-258...................................Diet therapy. Dietary cookbooks
259.........................................Vitamin therapy
260-263...................................Chemotherapy
265-267...................................Antibiotic therapy. Antibiotics
270-282...................................Immunotherapy. Serotherapy
283-298...................................Endocrinotherapy. Organotherapy
300-666...................................Drugs and their actions
671-671.5................................Nonprescription drugs. Patent medicines
695-893...................................Physical medicine. Physical therapy. Including massage, exercise, occupational therapy, hydrotherapy, phototherapy, radiotherapy, thermotherapy, electrotherapy
930-931...................................Rehabilitation therapy
950.........................................Rehabilitation technology

RS - Pharmacy and materia medica 

125-131.9................................Formularies. Collected prescriptions
139-141.9................................Pharmacopoeias
151.2-151.9.............................Dispensatories
153-441...................................Materia medica
160-167.........................................Pharmacognosy. Pharmaceutical substances (Plant, animal, and inorganic)
189-190.........................................Assay methods. Standardization. Analysis
192-199.........................................Pharmaceutical technology
200-201.........................................Pharmaceutical dosage forms
250-252.........................................Commercial preparations. Patent medicines
355-356.........................................Pharmaceutical supplies
400-431.........................................Pharmaceutical chemistry
441................................................Microscopical examination of drugs

RT - Nursing 

89-120.....................................Specialties in nursing

RV - Botanic, Thomsonian, and eclectic medicine 

1-431.................................Botanic, Thomsonian, and eclectic medicine

RX - Homeopathy 

211-581...................................Diseases, treatment, etc.
601-675...................................Materia medica and therapeutics

RZ - Other systems of medicine 

201-275...................................Chiropractic
301-397.5................................Osteopathy
399..........................................Osteo-magnetics, neuropathy, etc., A-Z
400-408...................................Mental healing
409.7-999................................Miscellaneous systems and treatments. Including magnetotherapy, mesmerism, naturopathy, orgonomic medicine, phrenology, radiesthesia

References

Further reading 
 Full schedule of all LCC Classifications
 List of all LCC Classification Outlines

R